Albert Spaier (9 July 1883 – 5 February 1934) was a French philosopher, professor of philosophy at the University of Caen.

Albert Spaier was born in Iași, Romania. Studying at the Sorbonne, he volunteered to fight for the French at the outset of World War I, and became a French citizen soon afterwards. He became a professor at Caen in 1927.

Spaier helped found the Recherches philosophiques, editing its philosophy of science section until his death. He died prematurely on 5 February 1934.

Works
 La pensée et la quantité; essai sur la signification et la réalité des grandeurs, 1927
 La pensée concrète; essai sur le symbolisme intellectuel, 1931
 La Nature et les éléments psychiques de l'habitude, 1935

References

1883 births
1934 deaths
Writers from Iași
Romanian emigrants to France
Naturalized citizens of France
20th-century French philosophers
Philosophers of science
Academic staff of the University of Caen Normandy
French male non-fiction writers
20th-century French male writers